The International University of Rabat or UIR (UIR) is a semi-public university founded in 2010 in Morocco. It delivers double-degrees, in collaboration with foreign universities, in law, engineering, aeronautics, energy engineering, architecture, business management and political sciences.

History
The university was founded in 2009 by the computer scientist Noureddine Mouaddib with the support of the Moroccan state and the Caisse de dépôt et de gestion (CDG) (French for Deposit and Management Fund). It started its activities in September 2010, following the foundation stone-laying ceremony by king Mohammed VI.

The university, the first of its kind in Morocco, was created under the supervision of the Ministry of National Education, Higher Education, Vocational Training and Scientific Research.

The UIR is committed to support major development projects in the country (energy action plan, industrial growth, aerospace, automotive, logistics, digital Morocco, sustainable development, NHDI, green Morocco...) through training, research, innovation and technology transfer.

Presentation
The institution offers nine training and research hubs :

School of Automotive Engineering.
 Institut des Classes Préparatoires aux Grandes Écoles (Institute of Preparatory Classes for Grandes Ecoles)
 Faculté d'Informatique et de Logistique (Faculty of Computer Science and Logistics)
 Faculté de Médecine
 Faculté de Médecine Dentaire (Faculty of Dental Medicine) 
 Sciences Politiques (Political Sciences)
 Rabat Business School
 School of Aerospace Engineering
 École Supérieure d'Ingénierie de l'Énergie (Higher School of Energy Engineering)
 École d'Architecture de Rabat (Rabat School of Architecture)
 Langues, Cultures et Civilisations (Language, Cultures and Civilizations)
 École de Droit (Law School)

Campus

The university provides students with a restaurant, a swimming pool and a library.
The university offers its students mant opportunities ti create student clubs in different domains to facilitate the integration There are playing fields for soccer, volleyball, tennis, basketball and table tennis tables. There are 6 residential buildings for students who live in the university. there is 2 supermarkets one known as "Superette" located near to Art Chill, then we have UIR Market under residential 2, and right next to the gym and to the laundry room. Both supermarkets offer a variety of products (dairy, bakery, meat, snacks...). They usually open from 7:30 A.M. to 11:30P.M and from 8:00 A.M. to 11:30 P.M. on the weekends.

Funding
The global investment totals 104 million dirhams, of which 57 million are brought by the CDG, and 47 million by the Moroccan State in the form of 20 hectares of land for the housing a modern residential campus. In addition the tuition varies between 72,000 and 88,000 dirhams depending on the chosen field of training, plus 18,000 dirhams for housing. Also, 20% of students receive scholarships according to their financial situation and educational merit.

Starting with the 2014–2015 academic year and in partnership with the CDG, the International University of Rabat has launched a fund known as "Tamwil UIR" to support students.
Tamwil UIR aims to partially finance the IUR students' tuition. The loan amount is capped with a repayment duration that does not exceed 12 years with a maximum delay equal to the overall duration of studies in the IUR, plus a year. About 600 students at the IUR benefited from the offered payment facilities.

Executive Education

Rabat center

The International University of Rabat has chosen to locate  near the science park of Salé (Technopolis Rabat-Salé, actually in Sala al-Jadida) to strengthen exchanges between the university and the business world.

Integrated to the campus of Rabat, the Center of Continuing Education provides original residential offers by integrating accommodation, access to the library as well as sports equipment.
<uir.ac.ma>at the 3rd year of bachelor's degree students must go on an exchange program with one of the universities that has partnership with RABAT BUSINESS SCHOOL (RBS) either for the spring of fall, 
universities at :
 - EUROPE 
 -North America 
 - South America 
 - AFRICA 
 - ASIA

Casablanca center

In February 2013, the IUR started its training center in Casablanca specialized in continuing education, which is located in the heart of the first offshoring park of Morocco, CasaNearShore.

Research and development

Besides its role as a multidisciplinary and internationally open university, the International University of Rabat is also a center of excellence in research and development, and the national leader in innovation. On May 27, 2014, the IUR was rewarded the first national innovation prize by the head of government, the winner being selected by the Moroccan Office of Industrial and Commercial Property (OMPIC).

Since its inception, the IUR registered patents in the areas of renewable energy and road safety. These patents are being used especially for the production of :
 Solar thermal collector dish
 Solar lamp
 LED crosswalk
 Braking detector and GPS/radio warning
 Smart road signs tracking
 Domestic wind turbine

 After four years of existence, the IUR is known as the national leader in innovation. It is located in the heart of Technopolis Rabat-Salé.

Scholarships
UIR grants a partial reduction or total exemption from tuition fees and possibly housing. They are intended for students from disadvantaged or modest backgrounds. This financial aid policy is a commitment of UIR over the duration of the program of study, according to the terms and conditions outlined in the “Regulations for the granting of scholarships”.
Application for scholarships includes the online scholarship form, the scholarship application form and the regulations for the granting of scholarships. This file, compiled from your applicant page (accessible from our website www.uir.ac.ma for new students only), will allow us to find out about your current financial and family situation. For this reason, you must provide all the requested documents so the commission can assess your case in full knowledge of the facts. We would like to assure you that all information provided to the commission will be remain confidential. The scholarship commission will only process complete applications. Reimbursement of registration fees cannot be made in the event that a partial or full scholarship is granted.
reference: https://www.uir.ac.ma/en/page/scholarships

References

External links
 Official website

Universities in Morocco
Buildings and structures in Rabat-Salé-Kénitra
Educational institutions established in 2010
2010 establishments in Morocco
21st-century architecture in Morocco